Lord Umra Narayan temple is the holy abode of Lord Vishnu with maa alaknanda flowing in her full tranquility. This temple is 5–7 km from the main town of Rudraprayag in Uttarakhand.

Origins
This temple was built by Adi Shankaracharya when he was on his way to Badri Dhaam. To wash your sins is Maa Alaknanda, whose splashing sound enchants your ear drum and gives you the feeling of piousness. Lord Umra is the Isth Dev of near by villages Umrolla Sour, Sumerpur &  Sann. After every harvest, the first group of crops are endowed in the holy Charnas of the Isth Dev and whose blessings radiates optimism and brings the well-being of all his minions. 
long time ago villagers of Umrolla Sour people appoint Gairola pandit for Daily Worship of Bhagwan Umara narayan at Temple Premises. Nowadays the temple is worshiped under the supervision of Mahant Sarju Das ji.
Jai Badri Vishaal, Jai Umra Narayan.

References

Hindu temples in Uttarakhand
Rudraprayag district
Vishnu temples